Animalore is the second studio album by the rock band Via Audio. It was released in 2010 by the independent record label Undertow Music.

Critical reception
Exclaim! wrote: "If you are willing to overlook the band's sometimes pedestrian take on indie pop, Animalore is, at best, an album that contains some of the most carefree and sunny verse/chorus/verse music this side of MGMT."

Track listing
 "Hello"
 "Goldrush"
 "Babies"
 "Tigers"
 "Digital"
 "Wanted"
 "Too Quiet"
 "Lizard"
 "Summer Stars"
 "Oh Blah Wee"
 "Olga"
 "Happening"

Personnel 
Jessica Martins: keyboards, guitars and vocals
David Lizmi: bass guitar
Tom Deis: guitar, vocals
Adam Sturtevant: drums

References

External links 
 Via Audio official website
 Free download of song "Babies"

2010 albums
Via Audio albums